"Keep Talking" is a song by Australian singer-songwriter and winner of season 7 of The X Factor Australia Cyrus Villanueva. It was released digitally and on CD single on 12 February 2016. The song debuted at number 44 on the ARIA Singles Chart. The music video was released on 11 February 2016.

Cyrus explains the song is about the breaking down of a relationship, saying "This song is about that helpless point in a relationship where nothing you seem to do can make it better. You might change what you do and take the blame – even when you think you shouldn't, hoping that will fix it. It's at that moment when you realise that walking away is the only thing you can do, but also is the thing that was meant to happen."

Cyrus performed "Keep Talking" live on The Morning Show and The Daily Edition  on 2 March 2016.

Track listing
Digital download
 "Keep Talking" – 3:32

CD single
 "Keep Talking" – 3:24
 "Keep Talking" (Acoustic)  – 3:24

Charts

Release history

References

2016 songs
2016 singles
Songs written by Anthony Egizii
Songs written by David Musumeci
Sony Music Australia singles
Song recordings produced by DNA Songs